The culture of Bengal defines the cultural heritage of the Bengali people native to eastern regions of the Indian subcontinent, mainly what is today Bangladesh and the Indian states of West Bengal and Tripura, where the Bengali language is the official and primary language. Bengal has a recorded history of 1,400 years. The Bengali people are its dominant ethnolinguistic group. The region has been a historical melting point, blending indigenous traditions with cosmopolitan influences from pan-Indian subcontinental empires. Bengal was considered to be the richest part of Islamic medieval India and during the era of the Bengal Sultanate it was described to be a major trading nation in the world, while during Mughal times, having triggered the proto-industrialization, its economy was worth 12% of global GDP. However, significant socio-economic inequalities existed during this period. As a part of the Bengal Presidency, it also hosted the region's most advanced political and cultural centers during British rule. Historically Feudalism has been widespread in the entire eastern Indian region (including Bengal). The feudal system flourished to a large extent under the British administration, which served as a means to exploit the Indian peasants by the British colonizers. This created a class of rich landlords in Bengal and a large population of poor peasants. It is noteworthy that a major portion of the Bengali intellectual community during the British era emerged from this wealthy class of landlords (also known as zamindars), as primarily they belonged to well educated families and got the economic opportunities to receive English education, often from abroad. The lower social classes remained in abject poverty and illiteracy. Thus, although the contribution of the Bengali intellectual community has been immense towards literature, science, politics and the Indian freedom movement, but still as it flourished under an exploitative imperial government, it mostly constituted of individuals belonging to the wealthy landlord families .

The partition of Bengal left its own cultural legacy. Bangladesh is the scene of a dominant Bengali Muslim culture, whereas Indian Bengali-speaking regions have a Bengali Hindu majority. Muslim-majority Bangladesh is home to a significant Hindu minority, whereas West Bengal has a large Muslim minority. Apart from these, there are also numerous ethnic and religious minorities. Kolkata, the capital of West Bengal, is a cosmopolitan city which houses a sizeable number of ethnic communities. Bengal is an important hub of classical South Asian arts. Festivals on the secular Bengali calendar are widely celebrated.

Fine arts

Performing arts

Music

Bengal has produced leading figures of Indian classical music, including Alauddin Khan, Ravi Shankar and Ali Akbar Khan. Common musical instruments include the sitar, tabla and sarod. The Baul tradition is a unique regional folk heritage. The most prominent practitioner was Lalon Shah. Other folk music forms include Gombhira, Bhatiali and Bhawaiya (Jhumur). Folk music in Bengal is often accompanied by the ektara, a one-stringed instrument. Other instruments include the dotara, dhol, bamboo flute, and tabla. Songs written by Rabindranath Tagore (Rabindra Sangeet) and Kazi Nazrul Islam (Nazrul geeti) are highly popular. Bangladesh is the center of Bangla rock, as well as indie, Sufi rock and fusion folk music.

Theatre

Bengali theater traces its roots to Sanskrit drama under the Gupta Empire in the 4th century CE. It includes narrative forms, song and dance forms, supra-personae forms, performance with scroll paintings, puppet theatre and the processional forms like the Jatra.

Dance

Bengal has an extremely rich heritage of dancing dating back to antiquity. It includes classical, folk and martial dance traditions.

Visual arts

Painting

The recorded history of art in Bengal can be traced to the 3rd century BCE, when terracotta sculptures were made in the region. In antiquity, Bengal was a pioneer of painting in Asia under the Pala Empire.

Miniature and scroll painting flourished in Mughal Bengal. Kalighat painting or Kalighat Pat originated in 19th-century Calcutta, in the vicinity of Kalighat Kali Temple of Kolkata, and from being items of souvenir taken by the visitors to the Kali temple, the paintings over a period of time developed as a distinct school of Indian painting. From the depiction of Hindu gods other mythological characters, the Kalighat paintings developed to reflect a variety of themes.

Modern painting emerged in Calcutta with the Bengal school. East Pakistan developed its own contemporary painting tradition under Zainul Abedin. Modern Bangladeshi art has produced many of South Asia's leading painters, including SM Sultan, Mohammad Kibria, Shahabuddin Ahmed, Kanak Chanpa Chakma, Kafil Ahmed, Saifuddin Ahmed, Qayyum Chowdhury, Rashid Choudhury, Quamrul Hassan, Rafiqun Nabi and Syed Jahangir among others.

Architecture
 
The earliest fortified cities in the region include Wari-Bateshwar, Chandraketugarh and Mahasthangarh. Bengal has a glorious legacy of terracotta architecture from the ancient and medieval periods. The architecture of the Bengal Sultanate saw a distinct style of domed mosques with complex niche pillars that had no minarets. Ivory, pottery and brass were also widely used in Bengali art. The style includes many mosques, temples, palaces, forts, monasteries and caravanserais. Mughal Dhaka was known as the City of Mosques and the Venice of the East. Indo-Saracenic architecture flourished during the British period, particularly among the landed gentry. British Calcutta was known as the City of Palaces. Modernist terracotta architecture in South Asia by architects like Muzharul Islam and Louis Kahn.

Bengali village housing is noted as the origin of the bungalow.

Sculpture

Ancient Bengal was home to the Pala-Sena school of Sculptural Art. Ivory sculptural art flourished across the region under the Nawabs of Bengal. Notable modernist sculptors include Novera Ahmed and Nitun Kundu.

Lifestyle

Textiles

Muslin production in Bengal dates back to the 4th century BCE. The region exported the fabric to Ancient Greece and Rome.

Bengali silk was known as Ganges Silk in the 13th century Republic of Venice. Mughal Bengal was a major silk exporter. The Bengali silk industry declined after the growth of Japanese silk production. Rajshahi silk continues to be produced in northern Bangladesh. Murshidabad and Malda are the centers of the silk industry in West Bengal.

After the reopening of European trade with medieval India, Mughal Bengal became the world's foremost muslin exporter in the 17th century. Mughal-era Dhaka was a center of the worldwide muslin trade.

Mughal Bengal's most celebrated artistic tradition was the weaving of Jamdani motifs on fine muslin, which is now classified by UNESCO as an intangible cultural heritage. Jamdani motifs were similar to Iranian textile art (buta motifs) and Western textile art (paisley). The Jamdani weavers in Dhaka received imperial patronage.

Modern Bangladesh is one of the world's largest textile producers, with a large cotton based ready made garments industry.

Clothing

At Jorashanko (Rabindranath Tagore’s home in Kolkata) different drapes of sari were improvised on so that women could step out of the andarmahal (inner house) where they were relegated. This had Tagore’s sister-in-law, [Jnanadanandini Devi], bringing the Parsi way of draping the sari from Mumbai to Bengal. Chitra Deb, in her book 'Thakurbarir Andarmahal', describes the entire process of how the Parsi sari was adapted into Bengali culture.

Bengal has produced several of South Asia's leading fashion designers, including Sabyasachi Mukherjee, Bibi Russell, Rukhsana Esrar Runi and Rina Latif.

Transport
Kolkata is the only city in India to have a tram network. The trams are claimed to slow down other traffic, leading to groups who currently voice abolishing the trams, though the environment-friendliness and the old charm of the trams attract many people.

Kolkata was also the first city in South Asia to have an underground railway system that started operating from 1984. It is considered to have the status of a zonal railway. The metered-cabs are mostly of the brand "Ambassador" manufactured by Hindustan Motors (now out of production). These taxis are painted with yellow colour, symbolising the transport tradition of Kolkata.

Bangladesh has the world's largest number of cycle rickshaws. Its capital city Dhaka is known as the Rickshaw Capital of the World. The country's rickshaws display colorful rickshaw art, with each city and region have their own distinct style. Rickshaw driving provides employment for nearly a million Bangladeshis. Historically, Kolkata has been home to the hand-pulled rickshaw. Attempts to ban its use have largely failed.

There are 150 different types of boats and canoes in Bengal. The region was renowned for shipbuilding in the medieval period, when its shipyards catered to major powers in Eurasia, including the Mughals and Ottomans. The types of timber used in boat making are from local woods Jarul (dipterocarpus turbinatus), sal (shorea robusta), sundari (heritiera fomes) and Burma teak (tectons grandis).

Weddings

Bengali weddings includes many rituals and ceremonies that can span several days. Although Muslim and Hindu marriages have their distinctive religious rituals, there are many common secular rituals. The Gaye Holud ceremony is held in Bengali weddings of all faiths.

Cultural institutions, organisations and events
Major organisations responsible for funding and promoting Bengali culture are:

 National Art Gallery (Bangladesh)
 Shilpakala Academy
 Bangladesh Folk Arts and Crafts Foundation
 Ministry of Cultural Affairs (Republic of Bangladesh)
 Ministry of Information & Cultural Affairs (West Bengal)

List of institutions and organisations

 Chhayanaut
 Bulbul Lalitakala Academy
 Nazrul Institute
 Samdani Art Foundation
 Bangladesh Shishu Academy
 Bangladesh Short Film Forum
 Bishwo Shahitto Kendro
 Bangladeshi Photographers
 Bangladesh National Philatelic Association
 Bangla Academy
 Moviyana Film Society
 Theatre Institute Chattagram
 Bangladesh Film Development Corporation
 Bangladesh Film Archive
 Biswa Bangla
 Paschimbanga Bangla Akademi
 Paschim Banga Natya Akademi
 Bangiya Sahitya Parishad

Festivals

Both Bangladesh and West Bengal have many festivals and fairs throughout the year.

Events

 Ekushey Book Fair
 Bishwa Ijtema 
 Ganga Sagar Mela 
 Rath Yatra 
 Ramadan 
 International Mother Language Day
 Kolkata Film Festival
 Dhaka Art Summit
 Kolkata Book Fair

Pastimes

Cinema

Kolkata and Dhaka are the centers of Bengali cinema. The region's film industry is notable for the history of art films in South Asia, including the works of Academy Award winning director Satyajit Ray and the Cannes Film Festival award-winning director Tareque Masud.

Sports

Traditional Bengali sports consisted of various martial arts and various racing sports, though the British-introduced sports of cricket and football are now most popular amongst Bengalis.

Lathi khela (stick-fighting) was historically a method of duelling as a way to protect or take land and others' possessions. The Zamindars of Bengal would hire lathials (trained stick-fighters) as a form of security and a means to forcefully collect tax from tenants. Nationwide lathi khela competitions used to take place annually in Kushtia up until 1989, though its practice is now diminishing and being restricted to certain festivals and celebrations. Chamdi is a variant of lathi khela popular in North Bengal. Kushti (wrestling) is also another popular fighting sport and it has developed regional forms such as boli khela, which was introduced in 1889 by Zamindar Qadir Bakhsh of Chittagong. A merchant known as Abdul Jabbar Saodagar adapted the sport in 1907 with the intention of cultivating a sport that would prepare Bengalis in fighting against British colonials. In 1972, a popular contact team sport called Kabadi was made the national sport of Bangladesh. It is a regulated version of the rural Hadudu sport which had no fixed rules. The Amateur Kabaddi Federation of Bangladesh was formed in 1973. Butthan, a 20th-century Bengali martial arts invented by Grandmaster Mak Yuree, is now practiced in different parts of the world under the International Butthan Federation.

The Nouka Baich is a Bengali boat racing competition which takes place during and after the rainy season when much of the land goes under water. The long canoes were referred to as khel nao (meaning playing boats) and the use of cymbals to accompany the singing was common. Different types of boats are used in different parts of Bengal. Horse racing was patronised most notably by the Dighapatia Rajas in Natore, and their Chalanbeel Horse Races have continued to take place annually for centuries.

The oldest native football clubs of Bengal was Mohun Bagan A.C., which was founded in 1889, and Mohammedan SC, founded in 1891. Mohun Bagan's first major victory was in 1911, when the team defeated an English club known as the Yorkshire Regiment to win the IFA Shield. Since then, more and more clubs emerged in West Bengal, such as Mohun Bagan's main rival SC East Bengal, a team of East Bengali Hindus who had migrated to West Bengal following the 1947 Partition of India. The rivalry also portrayed the societal problems at that time as many of the Mohun Bagan fans were Ghotis who hated the East Bengali immigrants, though Hindu. Mohammed Salim of Calcutta became the first South Asian to play for a European football club in 1936. In his two appearances for Celtic F.C., he played the entire matches barefoot and scored several goals. In 2015, Hamza Choudhury became the first Bengali to play in the Premier League and is predicted to be the first British Asian to play for the England national football team.

Bengalis are very competitive when it comes to board and home games such as Pachisi and its modern counterpart Ludo, as well as Latim, Carrom Board, Chor-Pulish, Kanamachi and Chess. Rani Hamid is one of the most successful chess players in the world, winning championships in Asia and Europe multiple times. Ramnath Biswas was a revolutionary soldier who embarked on three world tours on a bicycle in the 19th century. Shakib Al Hasan, Mushfiqur Rahim, Mashrafe Bin Mortaza, Tamim Iqbal, Soumya Sarkar, Liton Das from Bangladesh and Pankaj Roy, Sourav Ganguly, Manoj Tiwary, Wriddhiman Saha, Mohammed Shami from West Bengal are internationally known cricketers . Local games include sports such as Kho Kho and Kabaddi, the latter being the national sport of Bangladesh.

Media
Bangladesh's Prothom Alo is the largest circulated Bengali newspaper in the world. It is followed by Ananda Bazar Patrika, which has the largest circulation for a single-edition, regional language newspaper in India. Other prominent Bengali newspapers include the Ittefaq, Jugantor, Samakal, Janakantha and Bartaman. Major English-language newspapers in Bangladesh include The Daily Star, New Age,  and the weekly Holiday. The Statesman, published from Kolkata, is the region's oldest English-language publication.

Literature

Bengal has one of the most developed literary traditions in Asia. A descent of ancient Sanskrit and Magadhi Prakrit, the Bengali language evolved circa 1000–1200 CE under the Pala Empire and the Sena dynasty. It became an official court language of the Sultanate of Bengal and absorbed influences from Arabic and Persian. Middle Bengali developed secular literature in the 16th and 17th centuries. It was also spoken in Arakan. The Bengali Renaissance in Calcutta developed the modern standardized form of the language in the late 19th and early 20th centuries. Rabindranath Tagore became the first Bengali writer to win the Nobel Prize in Literature in 1913, and was also the first non-European Nobel laureate. Kazi Nazrul Islam became known as the Rebel Poet of British India. After the partition of Bengal, a distinct literary culture developed in East Bengal, which later became East Pakistan and Bangladesh.

Philosophy
The works of ancient philosophers from Bengal have been preserved at libraries in Tibet, China and Central Asia. These include the works of Atisa and Tilopa. Medieval Hindu philosophy featured the works of Chaitanya.

Sufi philosophy was highly influential in Islamic Bengal. Prominent Sufi practitioners were disciples of Jalaluddin Rumi, Abdul-Qadir Gilani and Moinuddin Chishti. One of the most revered Sufi saints of Bengal is Shah Jalal.

See also
 Culture of Bangladesh
 Culture of West Bengal

Notes